The 1956 California Golden Bears football team was an American football team that represented the University of California, Berkeley in the Pacific Coast Conference (PCC) during the 1956 NCAA University Division football season. In their 10th and final year under head coach Pappy Waldorf, the Golden Bears compiled a 3–7 record (2–5 against PCC opponents), finished in eighth place in the PCC, and were outscored by their opponents by a combined total of 181 to 135.

At the Big Game and even though they even though they were a 14-point underdog, the Bears beat Stanford. Waldorf's players knew that it was his last game and following the win they carried him off the field on their shoulders. Pappy Waldorf was inducted into the College Football Hall of Fame in 1966.[1]

That season, team's statistical leaders included Joe Kapp with 667 passing yards, Herb Jackson with 462 rushing yards, and Norm Becker with 313 receiving yards. Kapp was inducted into the College Football Hall of Fame in 2004.

Schedule

References

California
California Golden Bears football seasons
California Golden Bears football